First Presbyterian Church is a historic Presbyterian church located at 200 W. Trade Street in Charlotte, Mecklenburg County, North Carolina. It was built in 1857, and is a one-story, Gothic Revival style stuccoed brick building.  The original spire was rebuilt in 1883-1884 and the side and rear walls of the church were taken down and a new structure was erected in 1894–1895.

It was added to the National Register of Historic Places in 1982.

References

External links

Churches in Charlotte, North Carolina
Presbyterian churches in North Carolina
Churches on the National Register of Historic Places in North Carolina
Gothic Revival church buildings in North Carolina
Churches completed in 1857
19th-century Presbyterian church buildings in the United States
National Register of Historic Places in Mecklenburg County, North Carolina
1857 establishments in North Carolina